German or Germán is the surname of the following people:

Art and music
Aleksei Yuryevich German (1938–2013), Soviet Russian filmmaker
Aleksei Alekseivich German, Russian film director and screenwriter
Anna German, Polish singer
Edward German, English composer
Lauren German, American actress
Robert German, American singer, guitarist, and songwriter
Tülay German (born 1935), Turkish female pop folk singer

Politics
Lindsey German, British anti-war activist
Mike German, Welsh politician
Obadiah German, American politician and lawyer
William Manley German, Canadian politician and lawyer
Yael German, Israeli politician, first female mayor of Herziliya

Sport
Antonio German, English footballer
Bert German, American football coach
Domingo Germán, Dominican baseball player
Esteban Germán, Dominican baseball player
Frank German (born 1997), American baseball player
Jammi German, American National Football League player
Jim German, American National Football League player
Les German, American Major League Baseball player
Natalya German (born 1963), Soviet sprint athlete
Peter German, Australian rules footballer
Ruslan German, Russian footballer
Tamás German, Hungarian footballer

Other
Ella German, friend of presidential assassin Lee Harvey Oswald
Eugênio German, Brazilian chess master
Jeff German (1953-2022), American journalist
Merlin German, U.S. Marine

See also
Surnames of different origins meaning "German":

 Deutsch (surname) (German)
 Douch (English)
 Němec (Czech)
 Németh (Hungarian)
 Tedesco (surname) (Italian)